Tapura orbicularis is a species of plant in the Dichapetalaceae family. It is endemic to Cuba.  It is threatened by habitat loss.

References

Endemic flora of Cuba
Vulnerable plants
orbicularis
Taxonomy articles created by Polbot